Don't Believe may refer to:

Don't Believe (album), a 2006 album by New Mexican Disaster Squad
Don't Believe (song), a 2010 single by Iranian-German singer Mehrzad Marashi
 "Don't Believe", a song by Seether from Finding Beauty in Negative Spaces